Wrestling has been an event at the Asian Games since 1954 in Manila, Philippines. Since the 1986 Asian Games Greco-Roman wrestling was included in the Games programme.

Editions

Events

Men's events

1954
 52 kg (F)
 57 kg (F)
 62 kg (F)
 67 kg (F)
 73 kg (F)
 79 kg (F)
 +79 kg (F)

1958
 52 kg (F)
 57 kg (F)
 62 kg (F)
 67 kg (F)
 73 kg (F)
 79 kg (F)
 87 kg (F)
 +87 kg (F)

1962
 52 kg (F,G)
 57 kg (F,G)
 63 kg (F,G)
 70 kg (F,G)
 78 kg (F,G)
 87 kg (F,G)
 97 kg (F,G)
 +97 kg (F,G)

1966
 52 kg (F)
 57 kg (F)
 63 kg (F)
 70 kg (F)
 78 kg (F)
 87 kg (F)
 97 kg (F)
 +97 kg (F)

1970
 48 kg (F)
 52 kg (F)
 57 kg (F)
 62 kg (F)
 68 kg (F)
 74 kg (F)
 82 kg (F)
 90 kg (F)
 100 kg (F)
 +100 kg (F)

1974
 48 kg (F,G)
 52 kg (F,G)
 57 kg (F,G)
 62 kg (F,G)
 68 kg (F,G)
 74 kg (F,G)
 82 kg (F,G)
 90 kg (F,G)
 100 kg (F,G)
  +100 kg (F,G)

1978-1982
 48 kg (F)
 52 kg (F)
 57 kg (F)
 62 kg (F)
 68 kg (F)
 74 kg (F)
 82 kg (F)
 90 kg (F)
 100 kg (F)
 +100 kg (F)

1986-1994
 48 kg (F,G)
 52 kg (F,G)
 57 kg (F,G)
 62 kg (F,G)
 68 kg (F,G)
 74 kg (F,G)
 82 kg (F,G)
 90 kg (F,G)
 100 kg (F,G)
 130 kg (F,G)

1998
 54 kg (F,G)
 58 kg (F,G)
 63 kg (F,G)
 69 kg (F,G)
 76 kg (F,G)
 85 kg (F,G)
 97 kg (F,G)
 130 kg (F,G)

2002–present
 55 kg (F,G)
 60 kg (F,G)
 66 kg (F,G)
 74 kg (F,G)
 84 kg (F,G)
 96 kg (F,G)
 120 kg (F,G)

Women's events
2002–present
 48 kg
 55 kg
 63 kg
 72 kg

Medal table

List of medalists

References
 FILA Database

 
Sports at the Asian Games
Asian Games